Acanthemblemaria harpeza is a species of chaenopsid blenny found around Navassa Island, in the western central Atlantic ocean.

Etymology 
The species name "harpeza" is Greek for "thorn hedge", referring to the thornbush-like nasal and orbital spines and cirri on the blennies' heads.

References

harpeza
Fish described in 2002
Fish of the Caribbean